Palladium House, formerly known as Ideal House is a grade II listed Art Deco office building located on the corner of Great Marlborough Street and Argyll Street in London.

History and description
The building was designed in by architects Raymond Hood and Gordon Jeeves in the art deco style as the London headquarters of the National Radiator Company (European subsidiary of the American Radiator Company). Its design was a scaled down version of the American Radiator Building, New York.

Built 1928–9, the building is a seven-storey office block, with black granite facing decorated with an inlaid champlevé design with Egyptian influences. The building was extended in 1935.

In 1981, it was declared a Grade II Listed Building.

References

Further reading

External links 

Art Deco architecture in London
Grade II listed buildings in the City of Westminster
Grade II listed office buildings
Office buildings completed in 1929